Borowa Góra may refer to the following places:
Borowa Góra, Masovian Voivodeship (east-central Poland)
Borowa Góra, Subcarpathian Voivodeship (south-east Poland)
Borowa Góra, Świętokrzyskie Voivodeship (south-central Poland)